Sofie Fatouretchi Royer, aka Sofie Royer, is an Austrian and Iranian artist and musician signed to Stones Throw. She was born in California to Iranian and Austrian parents.

Sofie Royer was a student of violin and viola at the Vienna Conservatoire before breaking away from the institution to live between New York, London and Los Angeles, where she became known as a DJ, an original member of Boiler Room and an NTS Radio resident DJ. During her time in Los Angeles, she worked at Stones Throw and brought artists including Mndsgn and Stimulator Jones to the label, as well as releasing her compilation Sofie's SOS Tape in 2016.

In 2020, Sofie Royer released her self-produced debut album Cult Survivor on Stones Throw, a collection of leftfield pop songs inspired by chanson, heartbreak and life’s overwhelming decisions. In 2022, Sofie announced her second album for Stones Throw, Harlequin, with the single “Feeling Bad Forsyth Street”. The album blends Sofie's nostalgia for early aughts reality television and American mall punk subculture, with her passion for her native city’s Vienna opera, ballet traditions and medieval performances. For the release, she collaborated on two music videos with Eugene Kotlyarenko who directed the satirical black comedy film Spree (film). Harlequin was released on 23 September 2022.

In 2022, Sofie Royer featured on Toro y Moi’s album Mahal, and has previously collaborated with other musicians including MISS WORLD, Onoe Caponoe, &ME and others.

In addition to her work in music, Sofie also studies Philosophy, Psychology and English at the Universitaet Wien, as well as painting at the University of Applied Arts. As an active artist, she has exhibited her work at L Art Galerie in Salzburg  and at Pina in Vienna.

Discography

Singles

Albums

References

External links
 

Living people
Musicians from Los Angeles
Stones Throw Records artists
Year of birth missing (living people)